Das Wespennest (German: The Wasp's Nest) was a weekly satirical magazine published in Stuttgart, Germany, in the period 1946–1949. Its subtitle was Politisch-satirische Wochen-Zeitschrift. It was one of the first magazines which were launched shortly after World War II.

History and profile
Das Wespennest was established by the German writer Wolfgang Bechtle in Stuttgart in 1946. It was published in Stuttgart on a weekly basis. Das Wespennest adopted a moderate political stance. Its contributors included Thaddäus Troll and Hans-Frieder Willmann. The circulation of magazine was nearly 35,000 copies per week. It folded in 1949.

References

External links

1946 establishments in Germany
1949 disestablishments in West Germany
Defunct political magazines published in Germany
Magazines established in 1946
Magazines disestablished in 1949
Satirical magazines published in Germany
German-language magazines
Weekly magazines published in Germany
German political satire
Magazines published in Stuttgart